President was a 38-gun fourth rate frigate of the Royal Navy, originally built for the navy of the Commonwealth of England by Peter Pett I at Deptford Dockyard, and launched in 1650.

After the Restoration in 1660, she was renamed HMS Bonaventure after a previous ship built in 1653 that had been blown up three years later. She was widened in 1663, and by 1677 her armament had been increased to 48 guns. In 1683 she underwent her first rebuild, relaunching as a 40-gun fourth rate ship of the line. Bonaventure was rebuilt a second time in 1699 at Woolwich Dockyard, relaunching as a fourth rate of between 46 and 54 guns. Her third rebuild took place at Chatham Dockyard, where she was rebuilt as a 50-gun fourth rate to the 1706 Establishment, relaunching on 19 September 1711. She was renamed HMS Argyll prior to the Jacobite rising of 1715, and on 27 January 1720 she was ordered to be taken to pieces at Woolwich for what was to be her final rebuild. She was relaunched as a 50-gun fourth rate to the 1719 Establishment on 5 July 1722, and saw much service in home and Atlantic waters. She was employed on blockade duties during the War of the Austrian Succession, and in 1741 Argyll captured five Spanish coasters, and with the assistance of two other warships cut free five captured British warships that were docked in north-western Spain.

In 1742 Argyll served to escort convoys of East Indiamen from St. Helena to England. In 1745 she returned to Britain by way of escorting a convoy and was paid off in 1746. After the conclusion of the war in 1748, Argyll was towed to Harwich and scuttled as part of a breakwater.

Notes

References

Lavery, Brian (2003) The Ship of the Line - Volume 1: The development of the battlefleet 1650-1850. Conway Maritime Press. .

Ships of the line of the Royal Navy
Ships built in Deptford
1650s ships
Ships built in Woolwich
Ships sunk as breakwaters